Mattia Busato (born 2 February 1993) is an Italian karateka. He is a four-time bronze medalist at the World Karate Championships. He is also the gold medalist in the men's individual kata event at the 2014 European Karate Championships held in Tampere, Finland.

He represented Italy at the 2020 Summer Olympics in Tokyo, Japan. He competed in the men's kata event.

Career 

In 2015, he won the silver medal in the men's individual kata event at the European Games held in Baku, Azerbaijan. In 2019, he won one of the bronze medals in this event at the European Games in Minsk, Belarus.

He competed in the men's kata event at the 2017 World Games held in Wrocław, Poland. In 2018, he won one of the bronze medals in the men's kata event at the World University Karate Championships held in Kobe, Japan.

He represented Italy at the 2020 Summer Olympics in Tokyo, Japan in karate. He finished in 4th place in his pool in the elimination round of the men's kata event and he did not advance to the next round. In October 2021, he won the gold medal in his event at the 2021 Mediterranean Karate Championships held in Limassol, Cyprus. In November 2021, he won one of the bronze medals in both the men's kata and men's team kata events at the World Karate Championships held in Dubai, United Arab Emirates.

He lost his bronze medal match in the men's kata event at the 2022 World Games held in Birmingham, United States.

Achievements

References

External links 
 

Living people
1993 births
Place of birth missing (living people)
Italian male karateka
Karateka at the 2015 European Games
Karateka at the 2019 European Games
European Games silver medalists for Italy
European Games bronze medalists for Italy
European Games medalists in karate
Karateka of Gruppo Sportivo Esercito
Competitors at the 2017 World Games
Competitors at the 2022 World Games
Karateka at the 2020 Summer Olympics
Olympic karateka of Italy
21st-century Italian people